Below are the Federal lands in the United States state of Tennessee

National Historic Sites
Andrew Johnson National Historic Site, established as a National Monument in 1935 and redesignated a National Historic Site in 1963.

National Cemetery
Andrew Johnson National Cemetery
Fort Donelson National Cemetery
Shiloh National Cemetery
Stones River National Cemetery

National Recreation Areas
Big South Fork National River and Recreation Area, shared with Kentucky

National Military Parks
Chickamauga and Chattanooga National Military Park (shared with Georgia), established 1890.
Shiloh National Military Park, established 1894,

National Historical Parks
Cumberland Gap National Historical Park (shared with Kentucky and Virginia), established 1940.

National Battlefields
Fort Donelson National Battlefield, established 1928,
Stones River National Battlefield, established 1927

National Parks
Great Smoky Mountains National Park, shared with North Carolina

National Parkways and Scenic Trails
Natchez Trace Parkway, shared with Mississippi and Alabama
Natchez Trace National Scenic Trail, shared with Mississippi

National Scenic Rivers
Obed Wild and Scenic River

National Forests
Cherokee National Forest

National Historic Trails
Overmountain Victory National Historic Trail, shared with Virginia, North Carolina, South Carolina
Trail of Tears National Historic Trail, shared with Oklahoma

 
Tennessee geography-related lists